Man Kumari GC (also G.C., and GC KC) is a Nepali communist politician and a member of the House of Representatives of the federal parliament of Nepal. She is also a member of the House Education and Health Committee.

She was elected to parliament under the proportional representation system from CPN UML.

Following the formation of Nepal Communist Party (NCP), she represents the new party in parliament, and was also appointed Baglung District "Co-Incharge" for the party.

References

Living people
21st-century Nepalese women politicians
21st-century Nepalese politicians
Nepal Communist Party (NCP) politicians
Communist Party of Nepal (Unified Marxist–Leninist) politicians
Khas people
People from Baglung District
Place of birth missing (living people)
Nepal MPs 2017–2022
1972 births